Finnur Orri Margeirsson (born 8 March 1991) is an Icelandic football defender who plays for FH.

Personal life
His brother is fellow footballer Viktor Örn Margeirsson.

References

1991 births
Living people
People from Reykjavík
Finnur Orri Margeirsson
Finnur Orri Margeirsson
Lillestrøm SK players
Finnur Orri Margeirsson
Finnur Orri Margeirsson
Expatriate footballers in Norway
Finnur Orri Margeirsson
Eliteserien players
Finnur Orri Margeirsson
Finnur Orri Margeirsson
Association football defenders